Alex in Wonderland is a 1970 American comedy-drama film directed by Paul Mazursky, written with his partner Larry Tucker, starring Donald Sutherland and Ellen Burstyn.  Sutherland plays Alex Morrison, a director agonizing over the choice of follow-up project after the success of his first feature film. The situation is similar to the one Mazursky found himself in following the success of Bob & Carol & Ted & Alice (1969) and he casts himself in a role as a new-style Hollywood producer. His daughter Meg Mazursky appears as Amy, one of Morrison's daughters. Noted teacher of improvisational theater Viola Spolin plays Morrison's mother. The film also features cameo appearances by Federico Fellini and Jeanne Moreau, and seems to be inspired by their work. In particular, Fellini's 8½ (1963), about a film director who's artistically stuck, is referenced. Moreau sings two songs on the soundtrack, "Le Vrai Scandale" (for which she wrote the words) and "Le Reve Est La."

Plot
Young director Alex Morrison feels compelled to follow his recent box-office hit with another blockbuster. While mulling over this dilemma, the director's mind wanders to his past, his present, and probable future.

Cast
 Donald Sutherland as Alex Morrison
 Ellen Burstyn as Beth Morrison
 Paul Mazursky as Hal Stern
 Meg Mazursky as Amy Morrison
 Glenna Sargent as Nancy
 Viola Spolin as Mrs. Morrison
 Andre Philippe as Andre
 Michael Lerner as Leo
 Joan Delaney as Jane
 Neil Burstyn as Norman
 Leon Frederick as Lewis
 Federico Fellini as himself
 Jeanne Moreau as herself

Reception
The film received mixed reviews from critics. Roger Ebert gave the film four stars, writing "the human story does work, remarkably well, and if the movie doesn't hold together we're not disposed to hold that against it." Emanuel Levy was more critical, calling it "arty and pretentious, lacking real wit." Tony Mastroianni of the Cleveland Press gave it a similarly negative review.

In a retrospective review written in 2011, Nathan Rabin of The A.V. Club found the movie to be "pleasant" and suggested that "Studios, audiences, and critics may have expected a major statement after Bob & Carol & Ted & Alice. Instead, Mazursky delivered a pleasant shrug of a movie, an affable afterthought." Time Out described the movie as "intriguing, if deeply flawed."

See also
 List of American films of 1970

References

External links
 
 
 }
 
 

1970 comedy-drama films
American black comedy films
American comedy-drama films
American satirical films
1970s English-language films
Films directed by Paul Mazursky
Films about filmmaking
American independent films
Metro-Goldwyn-Mayer films
Films about film directors and producers
1970s American films